Boditi (Amharic: ቦዲቲ) is city in southern Ethiopia. It is the administrative center of Damot Gale woreda. The town is bounded by Shasha-Gale Kebele in the north, Ade-Koisha Kebele in the south, Chawkare Kebele in the east and Sibaye-Korke kebele in the west.

As of 2006 permanent postal service is available, as well as electricity and telephone service, more colleges and higher educational Institutions are currently being developed as more number of school aged kids are increasing.
The map attached to C. W. Gwynn's account of his 1908/09 triangulation survey of southern Ethiopia shows Boditi, with the note that it had a market. During the early 1930s, the market was held on Tuesdays and was very important. In 1969, a group of Swedish architectural students surveyed Boditi, and presented their findings to the University of Lund.

Demographics
The 1994 national census reported this town had a total population of 13,400 of whom 6,479 were men and 6,921 were women. Boditi is one of densely populated areas in Southern Nations Nationalities and Peoples Region. Total population of the town as conducted by central statistical agency of Ethiopia in 2020 is 61,983. Among these Males count 30,092 and Females count 31,891.

References 

Wolayita
Populated places in the Southern Nations, Nationalities, and Peoples' Region
Cities and towns in Wolayita Zone
Ethiopia
Cities and towns in Ethiopia